Anna Langås Jøsendal (born 29 April 2001) is a Norwegian professional footballer who plays as a forward for Toppserien club Rosenborg and the Norway national team.

International career
Jøsendal is a former Norwegian youth international. In June 2022, she was included in Norway's squad for UEFA Women's Euro 2022. She made her senior team debut on 25 June 2022 in a 2–0 friendly win against New Zealand.

Career statistics

International

References

External links
 

2001 births
Living people
People from Odda
Norwegian women's footballers
Norway women's youth international footballers
Norway women's international footballers
Toppserien players
Avaldsnes IL players
Rosenborg BK Kvinner players
UEFA Women's Euro 2022 players
Women's association footballers not categorized by position